Lemon Drop Kick is a female-fronted Japanese/American rock band with Japanese and American members based in the Los Angeles area. Their most notable published work includes four songs on The Fast and the Furious (2006 video game) soundtrack published for the PlayStation 2 and PlayStation Portable (PSP) consoles developed by Sony. Another notable published work is the use of their song "11:40" on the soundtrack for the American action film Into the Sun (2005 film) starring Steven Seagal.

The band's current lineup includes vocalist Miyako Matsumura (founding member), guitarist Erik Minamihata, guitarist Jeff Hall (founding member), and drummer Justin Kaehler (founding member), along with support member bassist Hiroshi Yamazaki. Former band members include founding members guitarist Kevin Lukasewski and bassist Yusuke Hisamitsu, along with support bassist Haru Tagami.

References

Rock music groups from California
Musical groups from Los Angeles
American musicians of Japanese descent